The 2003 Taungdwingyi earthquake struck central Myanmar at midnight, on 21 September with a magnitude of  6.6.

Geology 
The earthquake occurred due to shallow strike-slip faulting. The source fault is located along the eastern foothills of the Pego Yoma range, and adjacent to the Sagaing Fault. Its epicenter is centered southeast of the nearby town of Taungdwingyi, at least 50 km from the Sagaing Fault and 360 km from Yangon. Shaking was felt in Bangkok and Chiang Mai. Numerous aftershocks were recorded in the region. Four of them were greater than M5.0.

Damage and casualties 
At least seven people were killed and 43 were injured. Damage was severe, over 180 ritual houses were destroyed, including a primary  school that collapsed. Liquefaction, sand boils and landslides were also reported. The small death toll is attributed to the fact that this quake occurred around midnight, therefore the collapse of the school did not result in any injuries.

See also
List of earthquakes in 2003
List of earthquakes in Myanmar

References 

2003 disasters in Asia
Earthquakes in Myanmar
2003 earthquakes
2003 natural disasters
2003 in Myanmar
2003 disasters in Myanmar